Fiona McLean, also known as Fiona Mogridge or Fiona Lee-Fraser, is a British former actress and TV presenter turned photographer.

She was known to millions of viewers as schoolgirl Laura Reagan in the BBC school drama Grange Hill, a role she played from 1986–1988. The following year, she co-presented the BBC children's series Move It with ex-Brookside actor Simon O'Brien, who himself would appear in Grange Hill from 2003.

Fiona now runs a photography business, specialising in weddings, cover shoots and portraiture. She is married to international racing driver Johnny Mowlem and has two children.

References

External links
 Fiona McLean Photography

Year of birth missing (living people)
Living people